Ebersbach can refer to several places in Germany:

Ebersbach an der Fils, a town in the district of Göppingen, Baden-Württemberg
Ebersbach, Görlitz, a town in the district of Görlitz, Saxony
Ebersbach, Meißen, a municipality in the district of Meißen, Saxony
Ebersbach (Döbeln), a village in the town of Döbeln, Mittelsachsen district, Saxony
The German name for Stare Siedlisko, in the Warmian-Masurian Voivodeship, Poland
several smaller municipalities and villages